Florence Freeman (1836–1883) was an American sculptor.

Freeman was born in Boston, Massachusetts, daughter of Peter Wilder Freeman and Frances Ann Dorr. After studying with Richard Saltonstall Greenough, she went to Italy under the aegis of Charlotte Cushman, and studied for one year in Florence with Hiram Powers. In 1862 she opened a studio in Rome, where she spent her professional life. She executed several bas-reliefs of Dante; a bust of Sandalphon; "The Sleeping Child"; "Thekla, or the Tangled Skein"; and several chimneypieces, one of which, "Children and the Yule Log and Fireside Spirits," was at the Centennial exhibition in Philadelphia (1876).

Florence (also called Flori) was a good friend of sculptress Harriet Hosmer, as well as many other artists then residing in Italy including Emma Stebbins, Margaret Foley, John Rollin Tilton, Edmonia Lewis and Anne Whitney.  She died in Rome on 8/7/1883 from consumption (tuberculosis).  She was buried there in the Protestant Cemetery.  Her younger brother James Goldthwaite Freeman of Boston handled her affairs.

An interesting family coincidence occurred between Florence and the artist William Wetmore Story.  While Flori was living in Rome, she socialized with W. W. Story's wife Emelyn, and was known to William as a female sculptor in the city.  In May 1879, she visited with Emelyn, their daughter Edith and Edith's very young children, Cressida (age 2) and Bindo (age 1).  In 1900, Mira Cressida Peruzzi de'Medici married her first cousin Edward Henry Eldredge (of Boston).  In 1905, Edward's sister Theodora Maria Eldredge married Harris Hooper Lawrence (also of Boston).  Harris Hooper Lawrence was the son of Florence Freeman's sister Susan Freeman and Richard Beardsley Lawrence.  So young Cressy met her future brother in law's aunt (Florence Freeman) in Rome in 1879.

References 

 "Florence Freeman", Appleton's Cyclopedia of American Biography, edited by James Grant Wilson, John Fiske and Stanley L. Klos. Six volumes, New York: D. Appleton and Company, 1887–1889.
 Privately held family letters from Florence Freeman to her family, 1862 to 1880.
 Privately held tintype photo of Florence Freeman, 1855.

1836 births
1876 deaths
19th-century American sculptors
American women sculptors
Artists from Boston
American expatriates in Italy
19th-century American women artists
Sculptors from Massachusetts